M. Frederick "Fred" Spiller (22 November 1884 – 14 September 1953) was a British lightweight boxer who competed in the early 20th century.

He won a silver medal in boxing at the 1908 Summer Olympics after losing the final of the lightweight competition against Frederick Grace. He continued boxing until his death on 14 September 1953.

References

External links 
 

1884 births
1953 deaths
Lightweight boxers
Olympic boxers of Great Britain
Boxers at the 1908 Summer Olympics
Olympic silver medallists for Great Britain
Place of birth missing
Olympic medalists in boxing
British male boxers
Medalists at the 1908 Summer Olympics